Wilson Lee Frost (December 27, 1925 – May 5, 2018) was an American politician and former Chicago, Illinois alderman, Frost served as alderman of the city's 21st (1967–1971) and 34th wards (1971–1987), totaling twenty years in Chicago's City Hall.

In December 1976, Frost served as interim mayor after the death of Chicago mayor Richard J. Daley and was briefly claimed to be Daley's successor. Had Frost successfully established this claim, he would have been the city's first African-American mayor.

Biography

Early life and education
Wilson Lee Frost was born the middle of four children on December 27, 1925 in Cairo, Illinois to Freddie (nee Bond; 1901–1970) and General Frost (1900–1935). Freddie met General at church and the two married in 1919. General worked for the railroad and Freddie worked as a homemaker. After a flooding in Cairo, Frost family relocated to Chicago, Illinois when he was six months old. Frost family moved to the Bronzeville neighborhood on the south side. Once moving to Bronzeville, Frost enrolled at Doolittle Elementary School where he played all the school's sport teams. After graduating from Doolittle in June 1939, Frost began attending Wendell Phillips High School, a predominately black public high school that following September.

At Phillips, Frost played junior varsity basketball and ran track. In addition to school sports, Frost played with the Chicago Junior Cardinals, a local junior league football team sponsored by the Chicago Sun-times. Frost graduated from Phillips in June 1943.  In September 1943, Frost enrolled in Wilson Junior College (now known as Kennedy-King College) to study Accounting. While attending Wilson, Frost was drafted into World War II in April 1944. After being discharged, Frost begin work as a clerical worker in the public debt bureau of the United States Department of the Treasury. Frost began attending Fisk University in January 1946 where he became a member of Kappa Alpha Psi fraternity. After college, Frost returned to Chicago and went on to attend Chicago-Kent College of Law, where he received his law degree. Frost was admitted to the Illinois bar, and practiced law in Chicago.

Chicago alderman (1967–1987)
Frost was first elected as an alderman in April 1967, beating alderman Samuel Yaksic, a white Republican, representing the 21st Ward which was 80% African-American. Frost was a Regular Democrat, and as a reward for his loyal service to the Daley machine, was selected for the position of president pro tempore of the Chicago City Council. In February 1971, Frost was replaced as alderman of the 21st ward by Bennett M. Stewart. After losing re-election in the 21st Ward, Frost was appointed 34th ward alderman in 1971 by Mayor Daley after it was merged with the 33rd ward and Rex Sande, who served as alderman since 1959 decided to retire.  
 
In December 1976, upon the death of longtime mayor Richard J. Daley, Frost declared that he was now acting mayor, based upon his interpretation of the city charter and the fact that he was serving as President Pro Tempore of the City Council. However, the majority of Chicagoans in the mid–1970s were highly resistant to the notion of a black mayor, and the power brokers even more so. Wilson found himself literally locked out of the mayor's office—he was told that the keys could not be found.

In a power struggle that lasted several days, the entirely Democratic city council determined that Frost was incorrect in his claim, and appointed Alderman Michael Bilandic as acting mayor instead. To appease African-American voters, the city council replaced Finance Committee chairman Edward Vrdolyak with Frost; the chairmanship carried some real power, as opposed to the titular position of council president pro tempore. To clarify the mayoral succession process, a new position of "Vice-Mayor" was created. Wilson continued to serve on the city council, representing the 34th ward until 1987.

Later life, personal and death
The last public office that he held was Commissioner of the Cook County Board of Appeals, from which he retired in 1998. Frost was married once, to Gloria Frost from 1951 until his death. Together they had four children. Frost died on May 5, 2018, in Palm Desert, California, at the age of 92.

References

1925 births
2018 deaths
People from Cairo, Illinois
Fisk University alumni
Chicago-Kent College of Law alumni
Chicago City Council members
Lawyers from Chicago
African-American people in Illinois politics
Kennedy–King College alumni
Members of the Cook County Board of Appeals
20th-century American lawyers
American military personnel of World War II
20th-century African-American people
21st-century African-American people